Jane Peters (born 1963) is an Australian classical violinist and Arts Ambassador for Australia.

Early life 
In 1963, Peters was born in Adelaide, Australia. Peters' father is a retired GP and her mother studied Botany.

Career 
At age 10, Peters performed as a violinist on stage.

At twelve Peters won a medal in France and performed on Australian TV. In 1982 she received her BA and her teacher in Adelaide was Lyndall Hendrickson. In 1986 she won the Bronze Medal at the International Tchaikovsky Competition.
Peters has been an Arts Ambassador for Australia.

Personal life 
Peters has a daughter named Emma. As of 2017, Peters resides in Rouen, Normandy, France.

Bibliography
 Philippe Borer, Aspects of European Influences on Violin Playing & Teaching in Australia, M.Mus. diss., 1988 (on Jane Peters' early training, see Appendix D, pp. 182–193) https://eprints.utas.edu.au/18865/
 Lyndall Hendrickson, A longitudinal Study of Precocity in Music, in Giftedness, a Continuing Worldwide Challenge, ed. by A. J. Cropley, New York, Trillium Press, 1985, pp. 192–203
 Heather Kurzbauer, Jane Peters: A self-willed violin prodigy at 30, in «The Strad», vol. 104, n. 1240 (August 1993), pp. 720–722

References 

Australian classical violinists
People from Adelaide
Living people
1963 births
21st-century classical violinists
Women classical violinists